Amphion (pre-1917: Амфiонъ) was a Russian monthly literary magazine published in Moscow in 1815. Prose was but a small part of its genda; what prevailed there were odes, fables in verse, elegies and translations of classics like Horace, Titus Livius and Lucian. It was the first Russian magazine where serious critical analysis of poetry, prose, drama and theatre productions started to feature on regular basis.
The central figure in Amphion was its editor-in-chief and co-publisher (alongside with S.Smirnov and Fyodor Ivanov), the poet and literary critic Alexey Merzlyakov (who also went down in history as the young Mikhail Lermontov's personal tutor). His in-depth analysis of Kheraskov's Rossiyada (serialized in Nos. 1–3, 5–6, 8—9), which is considered to be the first work of literary criticism in Russia, had a strong formative influence on Russian literary scene of the time.

The magazine proved to be short-lived, only 12 issues of it came out, but among the authors whose work appeared there for the first time were Vasily Zhukovsky, Konstantin Batyushkov, Pyotr Vyazemsky, Fyodor Kokoshkin, Denis Davydov and Wilhelm Küchelbecker.

References

1815 establishments in the Russian Empire
Defunct literary magazines published in Europe
Defunct magazines published in Russia
Literary magazines published in Russia
Literary translation magazines
Magazines established in 1815
Magazines disestablished in 1816
Magazines published in Moscow
Monthly magazines published in Russia
Russian-language magazines